The Ethel Wilson Fiction Prize, established in 1985 as one of the BC and Yukon Book Prizes, is awarded annually to the best work of fiction by a resident of British Columbia, Canada.

The award is named after novelist and short story writer Ethel Wilson, author of Swamp Angel (1954) and The Innocent Traveller (1949).

Winners and nominees

References

External links
Ethel Wilson Fiction Prize, official website

BC and Yukon Book Prizes
Awards established in 1985
1985 establishments in British Columbia
Canadian fiction awards